La razón de la culpa  (English: "The reason for the blame") is a 1942 film directed by Juan José Ortega who also directed Corazón salvaje. The film stars Blanca de Castejón, Andrés Soler and María Elena Marqués as well as Pedro Infante as Roberto. This was one of Ricardo Montalban's first films.

Pedro Infante was still a novice when he was cast in the role of Roberto, a Spaniard gachupín, but it was his northern accent (Sinaloa) that caused the director Juan José Ortega to make the decision to overdub Infante's voice with that of Jesús Valero, who was from Spain. While it was Valero's speaking voice in the film, it was Infante's voice giving character to the songs he interprets. When the film was broadcast on Netflix Spain however, all the voices were overdubbed so that the accents matched those of the viewers in Spain. The role as Roberto was the only film that Infante appeared in that he portrayed a foreigner.

Songs 
 Rosalía
 Bendita Palabra by Agustín Lara

Plot  
Robert (Pedro Infante) meets and falls in love with a married woman while on a transatlantic crossing from Spain to Mexico. Once in Mexico, he goes to her home and claims to be a friend of her husband Andrés (Andrés Soler) and is offered lodging until he returns.

Cast 
 Blanca de Castejón as Maria de la Paz
 Andrés Soler as Andrés
 María Elena Marqués as Blanca
 Pedro Infante as Roberto
 Mimí Derba as Felisa, Andrés' sister
 Carolina Barret as Estela
 Jesús Graña as Colonel Alberto
 Conchita Sáenz as Sofia
 Araceli Fernández as Estela
 Roberto Cañedo
 Ricardo Montalban

References

External links 
 
 

1943 films
Mexican romantic drama films